Broxburn, Uphall and Winchburgh is one of the nine wards used to elect members of the West Lothian Council. It elects four Councillors.

Councillors

Election Results

December 2022 by-election 
Following the death of Scottish Labour councillor, Ann Davidson, a by-election was triggered and was held on 1 December 2022, where Tony Boyle won for Scottish Labour.

2022 Election
2022 West Lothian Council election

2017 Election
2017 West Lothian Council election

2012 Election
2012 West Lothian Council election

2007 Election
2007 West Lothian Council election

References

Wards of West Lothian
Broxburn, West Lothian